9Q or 9-Q may refer to:

9Q, IATA code for PBair
9Q, Aircraft registration for the Democratic Republic of the Congo
9q, an arm of Chromosome 9 (human)
9Q, designation for one of the Qumran Caves
GCR Class 9Q, a class of British 4-6-0 steam locomotive

See also
Q9 (disambiguation)